Mikhail Batin (Михаил Александрович Батин) (born July 3, 1972) is a Russian businessman and politician. He is Chairman of the Board of the NGO "Science For Life-Extension".

Mikhail Batin, a follower of the Russian cosmism ideas, is actively supporting research projects to study the mechanisms of aging and longevity.

Biography
Batin graduated from Kostroma State University. In 1995, he organized a consulting company  United Consultants FDP. In 2004, he was elected deputy of the Kostroma Oblast Duma. In 2005, he was elected Chairman of Federation of Trade Unions of the Kostroma region.

Current activity
Mikhail Batin and his foundation are amongst the organisers of the 2nd International Conference «Genetics of Aging and Longevity»  in Moscow and amongst the founders of the world's first Longevity political party which started in Moscow in July 2012 and triggered the process of the formation of similar parties throughout the world.

According to the biographical note on the "Futurology" book and multiple interviews, Mikhail Batin is the Director of the Regenerative Medicine Laboratory at the Moscow Institute of Physics and Technology.

Posts
 Director General of JSC «United Consultants FDP (1995-2002)
 Chairman of the Board of Directors of the group of companies  (2002-2004)
 Chairman of the Commission on Social Policy of Kostroma Region (2004 -)
 Chairman of Federation of Trade Unions of the Kostroma region (2005-2008)

Awards 
 Diploma of Governor of Kostroma region for work on additional education students
 Diploma of the Ministry of Education of Russia for the Best Educational Camp
 Jubilee Medal of the Federation of Independent Trade Unions of Russia

He is considered to be the advocate of Russia's transhumanist movement and the follower of Russian cosmists.

As co-chairman President of Science for Life Extension Foundation, he organized the Third International Conference on Genetics of Aging and Longevity in Sochi, Russia.

Bibliography

Books
 M. Batin "Cures for aging". 2007

Publications
 Science closes on aging secrets
 The mission of the Russian people. What is it?
 The medicine of old age will be found
 The agenda

Notes

References
Charitable Foundation for Research Support, "Science for Life Extension". Founder - Mikhail Batin.

External links
Interviews
 To desire immortality is not shameful. Russian magazine
 First class second youth. Commersant newspaper
 Michael Batin and Ksenia Sobchak on radical life extension. Video
 More life. Itogi magazine
 Congress of United Russia: should "bears" eat "bears?" Party of Pensioners taken off the elections in Kostroma. Svoboda radio
 Yaroslavl scientists demanded increased government funding of science. REGNUM information agency

Living people
Russian politicians
Life extensionists
1972 births
Russian transhumanists